Gerrit, Count Schimmelpenninck (25 February 1794 – 4 October 1863) was a Dutch businessman and politician, whose views ranged from liberal to conservative. He was the son of Grand Pensionary Rutger Jan Schimmelpenninck and a member of the Dutch Reformed Church. He was also the first holder of the modern day post Prime Minister of the Netherlands, then known as the Chairman of the Council of Ministers

After other functions, among which chief of the Nederlandsche Handelmaatschappij, he became head of secretary in Saint Petersburg and later in London.

The primary reason of William II to get him to the Netherlands and have him be appointed as Prime Minister of the Netherlands was to keep Thorbecke out of the Council of Ministers. In March 1848 he became Chairman of the Council of Ministers, holding the ministerial offices of Minister of Foreign Affairs and Minister of Finance. His proposal to design a Constitution following British model, which would imply that the Senate could not be dissolved by the King, was rejected by the other ministers. He tendered his resignation on 14 May 1848 and was succeeded by Jacob de Kempenaer.

References
 
 

1794 births
1863 deaths
Politicians from Amsterdam
Dutch members of the Dutch Reformed Church
Commanders of the Order of the Netherlands Lion
Counts of the Netherlands